David Rafael Lazari (born 30 April 1989) is a Brazilian professional footballer.

Career
In August 2010 Lazari signed for Sliven 2000 in the A PFG, where he played until the end of the year. In October 2011, he joined Dinamo Brest in the Belarusian Premier League. On 31 December 2018, it was announced that Tai Po had reached an agreement with Pegasus to swap Lazari in exchange for João Emir. After spending over a year at Pegasus, his stay was cut short due to the 2020 coronavirus pandemic which caused the 2019–20 season to be suspended. On 8 April 2020, Lazari agreed to a mutual termination with Pegasus.

Honours

Club
Tai Po
 Hong Kong Sapling Cup: 2016–17

References

External links
 

Living people
1989 births
Brazilian footballers
Brazilian expatriate footballers
Expatriate footballers in Bulgaria
Expatriate footballers in Belarus
Expatriate footballers in Qatar
Expatriate footballers in Kuwait
Expatriate footballers in Nicaragua
Expatriate footballers in Hong Kong
Brazilian expatriate sportspeople in Bulgaria
Brazilian expatriate sportspeople in Kuwait
Association football midfielders
Joinville Esporte Clube players
Futebol Clube Santa Cruz players
OFC Sliven 2000 players
FC Dynamo Brest players
Qadsia SC players
Trindade Atlético Clube players
Mesaimeer SC players
Grêmio Esportivo Novorizontino players
Real Estelí F.C. players
Tai Po FC players
TSW Pegasus FC players
Qatari Second Division players
Hong Kong League XI representative players
Kuwait Premier League players
Associação Atlética Caldense players
Associação Ferroviária de Esportes players
Uberlândia Esporte Clube players
People from Novo Horizonte, São Paulo